In video gaming, the HUD (heads-up display) or status bar is the method by which information is visually relayed to the player as part of a game's user interface. It takes its name from the head-up displays used in modern aircraft.

The HUD is frequently used to simultaneously display several pieces of information including the main character's health, items, and an indication of game progression (such as score or level).

Shown on the HUD 

While the information that is displayed on the HUD depends greatly on the game, there are many features that players recognize across many games. Most of them are static onscreen so that they stay visible during gameplay. Common features include:

 Health/lives – this might include the player's character and possibly other important characters, such as allies or bosses. Real-time strategy games usually show the health of every unit visible on screen. Also, in many (but not all) first- and third-person shooters, when the player is damaged, the screen (or part of it) flashes briefly (usually in red color, representing blood) and shows arrows or other similar images that point to the direction the threat came from, thus informing the player from which direction the enemies are attacking. In many fighting games, there are often two health bars on the top of the screen which often depletes to the middle (sometimes the opposite direction) with every punch or kick the player/enemy inflicts to their opponent.
 Time – This may be a timer counting down the time limit or the time left until a specific event. It may also be a timer counting up to records such as lap times in racing games, or the length of time a player can last in games based on survival. Many HUDs also use time displays to show the in-game time, such as the current time of day or year within the game. Some games may also display the real time.
 Weapons/ammunition – Most action games (first- and third-person shooters in particular) show what weapon is being used, and also how much ammunition is in it. Can show other available weapons, and objects like health packs, radios, etc.
 Capabilities – gameplay options that are often accessible by the player during gameplay, such as available weapons, items, or spells. This can include when the ability will become usable again, such as ammunition, magic points, or some other type of "charge up" timer. Icons and/or text may appear in the HUD to indicate other actions that are only available at certain times or in certain places, to show they are available to perform and which button performs it; for example the text "A – open door" may be displayed, but only when the character is near a door.
 Menus – Menus to exit, change options, delete files, change settings, etc.
 Game progression – the player's current score, money, lap, or level (as in stage or as in experience points). This might also include the character's current task or quest.
 Mini-map – a small map of the area that can act like a radar, showing the terrain, allies and/or enemies, locations like safe houses and shops, streets, etc.
 Speedometer/tachometer – used in most games which feature user operated vehicles. Usually shown only when driving one of these.
 Context-sensitive information – shown only as it becomes important, such as tutorial messages, special one-off abilities, and speech subtitles.
 Reticle/cursor/cross-hair – an indication of where the character is aiming or where the mouse pointer is. Pressing a key while pointing at an object or character with the cursor can issue actions like shooting, talking, picking up objects, manipulating switches, using computers, etc.
 Stealthometer – displays the awareness level of enemies to the player's presence (used mainly in stealth games and some first-person shooters).
 Compass/quest arrow - sometimes found in RPGs, first-person shooters and driving games, they help guide the player toward the objective.  An example is in the first-person shooter BioShock, which displays an arrow pointing the direction of the next objective on the top of the player's HUD. Sometimes the compass itself might not be a real compass, rather one that points toward the next location or goal. Another notable example is in the open-world driving game Crazy Taxi.

There are also trends common among genres and platforms. Many online games show player names and a chat text box for talking to the other players. RTS games tend to have complex user interfaces, with context-sensitive panels and a full-overview mini-map with fog of war.

How the HUD is displayed 

Typically this information is represented numerically, with the health level being a number from 0–100 (percent): 100 representing full health and 0 representing empty, no health or death. However, many other methods of visual representation can be used. For instance, certain games employ a "health bar" which empties as the player becomes hurt such as Tekken, Street Fighter, and many others.

Armour levels are also commonly monitored, either through a separate readout, or as part of the health system. For example, some Halo games use one recharging shield bar, acting as the health level. When this is depleted the player can only take a few more hits before their death. The same goes in Destroy All Humans!, but in the form of the player's shields. Traditionally, games used lives to represent health. Every time the main character was injured they would lose one of their limited lives. Another way to display the life in the HUD is demonstrated in Gears of War, where the characters life is displayed only when they are taking damage, in which case a red cog known as the Crimson Omen appears in the center of the screen. The more visible the Crimson Omen is, the more damage the player has sustained and the closer they are to death. This health system is known as the 'Red Ring' system.

There is also a lot of variance with regards to the display of other information. Some games permanently display all the weapons a character is currently carrying, others rely on a pull up weapon selector. Inventory or storage space may also be permanently overlaid over the screen, or accessed via a menu. Alternatively, only a limited number of items stored in the inventory might be displayed at once, with the rest being rotated into view using the [ and ] keys.

In order to maintain the suspension of disbelief, some games make the HUD look like a real HUD within the context of the game's world. Many first-person vehicle simulation games use this technique, showing instruments and displays that the driver of the vehicle would be expected to see. The displays in the helmet in the first-person adventure game Metroid Prime or Star Wars: Republic Commando also mimic the player's point of view. A similar method is used in Tom Clancy's Ghost Recon Advanced Warfighter and Crysis. In some of these circumstances where the player and character within the game are meant to see the same "HUD" information, such as Halo, the term "HMD" (Helmet-Mounted Display) would technically be more accurate.

Some games, in an attempt to increase player immersion and reduce potential screen clutter, have most or all elements disappear when not needed (usually when the status they display is static), a method commonly referred to as a "dynamic HUD". In most cases, the player can display them all by pausing the game or pressing a button. Some games also give players control over the HUD, allowing them to hide elements and customize position, size, color, and opacity. World of Warcraft is notable for allowing players to significantly modify and enhance the user interface through Lua scripting. Another example is Horizon Zero Dawn, which allows player to set the display of each element to always appear, show only when relevant, or never display.

Despite the modern dominance of 3D graphics in games, HUDs are frequently rendered with a 2D look, often using sprites.

Reduction of elements 

Sometimes, for the sake of realism, information normally displayed in the HUD is instead disguised as part of the scenery or part of the vehicle in which the player is traveling. For example, when the player is driving a car that can sustain a certain number of hits, a smoke trail might appear when the car can take only two more hits, fire might appear from the car to indicate that the next hit will be fatal. Wounds and bloodstains may sometimes appear on injured characters who may also limp, stagger, slouch over or breathe heavily to indicate they are injured, a notable example being Resident Evil 2. 

In rare cases, no HUD is used at all, leaving the player to interpret the auditory and visual cues in the game-world. The elimination of elements has hardly become a trend in game development, but can be witnessed in several titles as of late. Some examples of games with little to no HUD include Astroneer, Silent Hill 2, Jurassic Park: Trespasser, Ico, The Getaway, Fable III, Another World, Mirror's Edge, King Kong, Dead Space, Call of Cthulhu: Dark Corners of the Earth, Resident Evil,Tomb Raider (2013) and Escape from Tarkov

Another method of improving realism and immersion in games is through the implementation of dynamic HUDs such as the HUD in Red Dead Redemption 2. These types of HUDs reduce screen clutter by only displaying specific bits of information when the in-game situation calls for it. For instance, when exploring on horseback, the player will only see the mini-map (and the horse's stamina meter if they are galloping). When the player enters combat, the game will display information related to ammunition amount and type along with the meters for player health, player stamina, "Dead Eye" ability, horse stamina and horse health. The racing game Split/Second purposefully concentrated the HUD into just the lap counter, position counter and the game's "power play" meter, all floating within the car's rear bumper, and completely dropping out common racing game elements such as lap timers or speedometers to reduce clutter and distractions.<ref>{{cite web|url=http://www.mtv.com/news/2459097/splitseconds-simple-hud/|title='Split/Seconds Simple HUD|publisher=MTV|author=john Tracey|date=2009-03-24}}</ref>

 HUDs and burn-in 
Prolonged display (that stays on the screen in a fixed position, remaining static) of HUD elements on certain CRT-based screens may cause permanent damage in the form of burning into the inner coating of the television sets, which is impossible to repair.  Players who pause their games for long hours without turning off such televisions or putting them on standby risk harming their TV sets.  Plasma TV screens are also at risk, although the effects are usually not as permanent.

 Other uses 
The Sega Dreamcast, released in 1998, uses a VMU on many games as a HUD. A notable example is Resident Evil 2, Resident Evil 3: Nemesis and Resident Evil – Code: Veronica all using the VMU to show a mini version of the HUD, which displays the protagonists health and ammo. This feature was resurrected with the introduction of the Nintendo Wii U, which uses the Wii U GamePad for some games as a HUD including Mario Kart 8 and Super Smash Bros. for Wii U''.

See also 
Menu (computing)
Second screen

References 
 General

 

Specific

Video game design
Graphical user interface elements
Video game terminology